Linda King is a former Hong Kong international lawn and indoor bowler.

Bowls career
King won the gold medal in the triples with Rae O'Donnell and Lena Sadick and double silver in the fours with Rae O'Donnell, Lena Sadick and Joan Humphreys and the team event (Taylor Trophy) at the 1981 World Outdoor Bowls Championship in Toronto.

She bowled for the United Services Recreation Club.

References

Hong Kong female bowls players
Living people
Bowls World Champions
Date of birth missing (living people)
Year of birth missing (living people)